Otoboke Beaver (in Japanese おとぼけビ～バ～) is a punk rock band from Kyoto, Japan, whose members currently consist of singer Accorinrin, guitarist Yoyoyoshie, bassist Hiro-chan, and drummer Kahokiss. The band formed in 2009; their most recent album Super Champon was released in May 2022.

Biography
The band is named after a love hotel in Osaka which was located near the high school of one of the band members. The band formed in 2009 while the members were active in a rock music club at Ritsumeikan University in Kyoto. The original members included Accorinrin on vocals, Yoyoyoshie on guitar, Pop on drums, and Nishikawachi on bass.

In June 2011, Otoboke Beaver released a demo CD featuring three songs, including an early version of "Chuchu Song", a live track that would be later re-recorded and distributed to people who helped fund the band's first trip to the United States. In 2012, the group released their first live album via Egypt Records. In 2013, they released a limited-edition single via Jet Set Records, featuring the newly recorded "Otobokebeaver Daijikenbo" and two live tracks. In March of the same year, the band released the mini-album Love Me Sign. Bassist Nishikawachi left the band in 2013 and was replaced by Hiro-chan, a fan who asked to join via e-mail.

Otoboke Beaver participated in Record Store Day in 2015, releasing the single "Akimahenka" on vinyl. In 2016, the band signed with the British label Damnably. The Okoshiyasu!! Otoboke Beaver compilation album was released that year, featuring the majority of the songs found on the group's first two mini-albums, with the addition of the "Akimahenka" single. The band recorded a live session for XFM and toured the UK with Shonen Knife and Leggy. The EP Bakuro Book followed shortly thereafter, with another EP titled Love is Short!! appearing the following year for Record Store Day 2017. The song "Love Is Short!!" reached the UK singles chart.

The band began touring internationally in 2016, including dates at the 100 Club in London and SXSW in the United States in 2017. Their trip to SXSW was financially assisted by fan-funding via Campfire and Kickstarter. Other notable tourmates have included The Cribs, Miyavi, Guitar Wolf, and Wussy.

The album Okoshiyasu!! Otoboke Beaver was re-released on vinyl for Record Store Day in 2018. In that year, founding drummer Pop announced her departure from the band. Pop was replaced by Kahokiss, who had attended the same university music club as the band's founding members almost a decade before.

In March 2019, Otoboke Beaver performed at the South by Southwest (SXSW) festival in Austin, Texas. The album Itekoma Hits, featuring new songs and compiling some previously-released singles, was released by Damnably in April 2019. The non-album single "Yobantoite Mojo" was released in late 2019; the song also served as the theme song for the Japanese TV comedy Susumu Inomata and 8 Mojo. Also in late 2019, the band played the Koyabu Sonic festival, featuring a mixture of comedy acts and bands in an 8000-person stadium held by the Yoshimoto company.

Along with releasing the single "Dirty Old Fart is Waiting for My Reaction" in early 2020, the members of Otoboke Beaver quit their day jobs to become a full-time touring band. They were able to tour for two weeks in Europe before the COVID-19 pandemic. During the lockdown period they focused on developing new songs and played several live shows via Instagram. The album Super Champon was released on 6 May 2022. Otoboke Beaver returned to touring in late 2022 with a series of shows in Europe, followed by their first full-length tour of North America. Another tour of Europe and North America followed in early 2023. Their performance at that year's SXSW received coverage from Rolling Stone, which described their set as "both a goddamned riot and tight as hell."

Musical style and influences 
According to its members, the band plays a "fast-paced and aggressive style of punk-rock", with "frequent changes in rhythm and tempo", accompanied by "gang vocals". Their songs feature love and relationships as regular themes, some based on singer Accorinrin's own experiences, and often reflecting themes of female oppression in modern society. This was not something Accorinrin was necessarily conscious of at first but she has embraced these feminist ideals after travelling abroad.

They have said they are inspired by a particular style of traditional Japanese comedy, Manzai. Its speed, tempo, and rhythm of delivery are an influence on their musical style. Accorinrin specifies Japanese comedian Ken Shimura and theatre comedy group Yoshimoto Shinkigeki as personal influences.

Each member draws inspiration from their own differing musical tastes: Yoyoyoshie likes Japanese rock, Hiro-chan likes hardcore punk, and Accorinrin and Kahokiss like Japanese pop music. They said that they are “influenced by western Riot Grrrl attitudes and the sounds of punk and angular post-rock”. The band mentioned further influences from groups such as Yapoos, Hikasyu, P-MODEL, Momoe Yamaguchi, and Afrirampo.

Critical response 
Otoboke Beaver's music has garnered them praise from the likes of Pitchfork ("even if their music is not explicitly feminist, there is power in hearing a group of four Asian women say exactly what they want"), and also from NPR, The Fader, Stereogum, i-D, and Fujirock Express.

In 2017, they were nominated for Best Live Act at the AIM Independent Music Awards. They have been featured on BBC6 radio. Dave Grohl of Foo Fighters described Otoboke Beaver by saying, "It’ll blow your mind, dude. It’s the most fucking intense shit you’ve ever seen." Upon the release of their album Super Champon in 2022, Anthony Fantano of The Needle Drop remarked "with two really fantastic albums under their belt at this point, is Otoboke Beaver not one of the best modern Punk bands that Japan has to offer right now?"

Members
Current members
Accorinrin – vocals, occasional rhythm guitar (2009–present)
Yoyoyoshie – guitar, backing vocals (2009–present)
Hiro-chan – bass, backing vocals (2013–present)
Kahokiss – drums, backing vocals (2018–present)
Former members
Nishikawachi – bass, backing vocals (2009–2013)
Pop – drums, backing vocals (2009–2018)

Discography

Albums
あなたの愛で満室中 | Anata No Ai De Manshitsu-chū (demo, 2011)
今夜限りなんて絶対ほんとに言わせないっ! | Konya Kagiri Nante Zettai Honto ni Iwasenai! (EP, 2011)
Present Progressive Form #002 (live, 2012)
Love Me Sign (EP, 2013)
Okoshiyasu!! Otoboke Beaver (compilation, 2016)
Bakuro Book (EP, 2016)
Love Is Short!! (EP, 2017)
Okoshiyasu!! Otoboke Beaver (remastered version, 2018)
Itekoma Hits (2019)
Super Champon (2022)

Singles
おとぼけビ～バ～大事件簿 | "Otobokebeaver Daijikenbo" (2013)
"Akimahenka" (2015)
"S'il Vous Plait" (2017) [Split Single w/ Say Sue Me]
"Anata Watashi Daita Ato Yome No Meshi" (2018)
"Yobantoite Mojo" (2019)

Videos
"S'il Vous Plait" (2017)
"Love Is Short!" (2017)
"Mean" (2017)
"Anata Watashi Daita Ato Yome No Meshi" (2019)
脱・日陰の女 | "Datsu, Hikage no Onna" (2019, directed by Haruka Mitani)
"Don't Light My Fire" (2019)
"Dirty Old Fart Is Waiting For My Reaction" (2020)
"I Am Not Maternal" (2022)
"Pardon?" (2022)
"I Don't Want to Die Alone" (2022)

References

External Links 

 Otoboke Beaver's Official Website (Japan)
 Otoboke Beaver's Official Website (Rest of World)
 Otoboke Beaver on Instagram
 Otoboke Beaver on Twitter
 Otoboke Beaver on Spotify
 Otoboke Beaver on Bandcamp
 Otoboke Beaver on Songkick
 Otoboke Beaver on Soundcloud
 Otoboke Beaver on Deezer
 Otoboke Beaver on Apple Music
 Otoboke Beaver on Tidal
 Otoboke Beaver on YouTube

All-female punk bands
Japanese punk rock groups
Musical groups established in 2009